Percy The Potty Pigeon (also known simply as Potty Pigeon) is computer game written by Shaun Hollingworth for the ZX Spectrum and published by Gremlin Graphics in 1984. The Commodore 64 version was programmed by Antony Crowther. There are 2 versions of the game, the C64 goal is to fly around and collect sticks to build a nest whereas the Spectrum version required worms collecting and feeding the chicks (although if the player tries to drop an egg on an enemy, they lose the worm). The player can defecate on cars and make them crash.

This game marks the beginning of Ben Daglish as a composer. Although all he did was write the notes for the death tune, this is still the game that got him into composing game music for the Commodore 64.

References

External links

Gremlin Interactive games
1984 video games
Commodore 64 games
ZX Spectrum games
Video games scored by Ben Daglish
Video games developed in the United Kingdom